John Edward Battye (19 May 1926 – June 2016) was an English professional footballer who played for Huddersfield Town and York City. He was born in Scissett, near Huddersfield, Yorkshire.

References

1926 births
2016 deaths
People from Scissett
Footballers from Huddersfield
English footballers
Association football wing halves
Huddersfield Town A.F.C. players
York City F.C. players
English Football League players